The Gables is a block of flats in Fortis Green, on the edge of Muswell Hill, London, and a grade II listed building with Historic England. The building was constructed in 1907 to a design by Herbert and William Collins in the Arts and Crafts and Jugendstil style.

Gallery

See also
Birchwood Mansions

References

External links
 

Grade II listed buildings in the London Borough of Haringey
Muswell Hill
Residential buildings in London
Houses in the London Borough of Haringey
Grade II listed houses in London
Arts and Crafts architecture in London
1907 establishments in England
Residential buildings completed in 1907